The Metropolis of Ephesus was an ecclesiastical territory (metropolis) of the Ecumenical Patriarchate of Constantinople in western Asia Minor, modern Turkey. Christianity was introduced already in the city of Ephesus in the 1st century AD by Paul the Apostle. The local Christian community comprised one of the seven churches of Asia mentioned at the Book of Revelation, written by John the Apostle. The metropolis remained active until 1922-1923.

History

Early Christianity

There had been a Jewish community at Ephesus for over three hundred years when Paul the Apostle visited Ephesus around 53 AD. Paul set out on his third missionary journey in 54 AD. He spent three months teaching in a synagogue in an effort to bring the Jews to accept union with the gentiles in Christianity, but without success. For the next two years he stayed in Ephesus seeking to convert Hellenized Jews and gentiles, and appears to have made many converts.

The Apostle John (4 BC - 100 AD) was traditionally said to have come to Ephesus during the period when Agrippa I (37-44) was suppressing the church of Jerusalem. There are records of John being arrested by the Emperor Domitian (reigned 81 -96 AD). He was released late in his life and returned to Ephesus, where it is thought that he wrote his Gospel. Tradition says that the Virgin Mary lived in Ephesus near to John. Apollos, a Jew from Alexandria who was a disciple of John the Baptist, arrived in Ephesus and met with Aquila and Priscilla.

Christian canon identifies the Epistle to the Ephesians as a letter to the church in Ephesus, and John mentions the church as one of the seven churches of Asia in the Book of Revelation. In Revelation (2:1–3), the church's perseverance, scrutiny toward alleged apostles and hatred of the Nicolatians are lauded, but the church is said to have "left its first love," to which Revelation calls on it to return.

Based on these traditions, it is generally believed that the city hosted a significant Christian community already from the 1st and 2nd centuries. Ephesus associated with the life of several saints of that era, such as the Philip the Evangelist, brother of the Apostle Barnabas, Hermione, Aristobulus, Paul of Thebes, Adauctus and his daughter, Callisthene. It is also thought that Mary Magdalene also lived there. Moreover, according to the Christian tradition, the first bishop of Ephesus was Apostle Timothy, student of the Apostle Paul.

Until the 4th century AD, Christianity and Paganism co-existed in the city, but Christianity became the dominant religion in Ephesus in the course of time. This is mainly evident from the conversion of religious monuments, the increased use of Christian symbols, as well as the destruction of various pagan places of worship. The apostle John has his grave in Ephesus.

Polycrates of Ephesus was a bishop at Ephesus in the 2nd century.  He is best known for his letter addressed to the  Pope Victor I, Bishop of Rome, defending the Quartodeciman position in the Easter controversy.

Late antiquity
After the First Council of Nicaea (325) and the organization of the ecclesiastical administration in the Roman provinces, Ephesus became the see of a metropolis, with the new metropolitan elected by the bishops of his province. The early organization of the Church paralleled that of the Roman state, and as Ephesus was the most important city of the province of Asia, its bishops became "Metropolitans of Asia", a title that remained in use long after the province itself had ceased to exist.

Based on the importance of their see, the metropolitans of Ephesus claimed a regional authority far beyond the borders of its own ecclesiastical province, encompassing most of Asia Minor, but this ambition was challenged by the rise of the Patriarchate of Constantinople, a process cemented by one of the canons of the Second Ecumenical Council of 381 AD that gave the bishop of Constantinople precedence over all other bishops other than the bishop of Rome. Although Ephesian ambitions were backed by Constantinople's rival, the Patriarchate of Alexandria, at the Council of Chalcedon in 451 its claims suffered a decisive blow. The bishop of neighbouring Smyrna, who had been subordinate to Ephesus and its major local rival for pre-eminence in the province of Asia, became an autocephalous archbishop, while Ephesus itself was demoted to second rank among the sees subject to Constantinople, after Caesarea in Cappadocia. These were major setbacks, which the award of the title of "Exarch of the Diocese of Asia" to the metropolitans of Ephesus could not ameliorate.

In the 5th century, the metropolis was involved in various ecclesiastical disputes. The First Council of Ephesus was held in 431 AD, and the Second Council of Ephesus, sometimes called the "Robber Council", was held in 449 AD. Cyril, Patriarch of Alexandria presided at the First Council, which was called by the Emperor Theodosius II to resolve the Nestorian controversy. Memnon, the Bishop of Ephesos, supported Cyril in condemning the archbishop of Constantinople, Nestorius, for heresy. The trial was held hastily, before the eastern supporters of Nestorius could arrive.  When the eastern delegation led by John of Antioch arrived they were scandalized at what had happened and held their own trial. They found Cyril and Memnon guilty and imprisoned them, drawing a stern rebuke from the Emperor. Cyril bribed government officials to regain his position. Two years later, John and Cyril came to a mutual agreement which temporarily resolved the dispute, until Pope Dioscorus I of Alexandria, the Champion of Orthodoxy, convened the Second Council of Ephesus.

In 475 the Miaphysite Patriarch of Alexandria, Timothy (457-477), supported by Emperor Basiliscus (475-476), restored the Miaphysite Paul as Metropolitan of Ephesus during the council convened in Ephesus, which dealt with the issue of accepting the Miaphysite circular of Basiliscus. Patriarch Akakios of Constantinople (472-489) refused to accept these decisions and forced the Emperor to annul them. The bishops of the Diocese of Asia had to renounce the decisions of that council, while the metropolitan of Ephesus, Paul, was deposed during the reign of Emperor Zeno.

Among the most important metropolitans of 6th-century Ephesus were Hypatius ( 530) and John. The former launched a campaign against Monophysitism and closely cooperated with Emperor Justinian I (527-565) on various ecclesiastical issues. On the other hand, the Miaphysite metropolitan John was a significant missionary, who preached in the city of Ephesus as well as in the nearby valley of the Meander River and Sardis. By permission of Emperor Justinian I he converted about 80,000 pagans to Christianity.

Middle and late Byzantine period
Ephesus continued to play an active role in various ecclesiastical disputes during the medieval period. When the Byzantine Iconoclasm dispute broke out (8th century), metropolitan Theodosius was an ardent advocate against the icons. However, a number of local clergymen refused to implement the official policy which condemned the worship of icons. This resulted in drastic measures by the state, including intervention of the army, under the general Michael Lachanodrakon, and massive expulsions of monks.

In the following centuries the metropolis maintained its power in the ecclesiastical hierarchy. In the Notitiae Episcopatuum of the middle and late Byzantine period, Ephesus continued to rank second, after Caesarea, among the metropoleis of the Patriarchate of Constantinople. In the second half of the 9th century, after the promotion of the autocephalous archbishopric of Smyrna to a separate metropolis, Ephesus lost control over three bishoprics: Phocaea, Magnesia ad Sipylum and Clazomenae, which came under the newly created metropolis. In the first half of the 11th century, the stylite Saint Lazaros lived on a column in the wilds of Mount Galesios, a few kilometers to the north of the city. The metropolitan paid little attention to the saint, and was often suspicious or outright hostile to him.

When the Emperor Michael VII Doukas was deposed in 1078, he was made bishop of Ephesus. After two years the city was captured by the Seljuk Turks, and he returned to Constantinople where he lived the remainder of his life. During the years after the fall of Constantinople to the Fourth Crusade (1204), the metropolis was part of the Empire of Nicaea. The Patriarchate of Constantinople was transferred to Nicaea at this time and this led to increased prestige for the metropolitans of Ephesus.

The Emperor of Nicaea, Theodore I Laskaris (1207/8-1222), married a Latin princess and in 1219 initiated negotiations over uniting the churches. The then Metropolitan of Ephesus, Nicholas Mesarites, was one of the main opponents to this policy.  He was also very influential in the election of the Ecumenical Patriarchs. The local metropolitans were also involved in the Arsenite dispute, which concerned the issues raised after the deposition of Patriarch Arsenios in 1259.

Towards the end of the Laskarid dynasty's rule the church of Ephesus seems to have been wealthy. The metropolitan Nicephorus came to Nicaea in 1260 with a large amount of money and was elected as patriarch, although he died soon after.

Ottoman period

Michael Louloudes was the last metropolitan of Ephesus before the Turks conquered the city in October 1304 or 1305. He escaped to Crete. The Turks converted the church of Saint John the Evangelist into a mosque. Despite this, due to its ancient prominence the Greek Orthodox Church hierarchy made extraordinary efforts to keep the see in existence. A new metropolitan, Matthew, was not elected until 1329, and it took ten years of fruitless attempts and bribery of the local emirs before he could actually take up residence in his see. After arriving in Ephesus he had to deal with the hostility of the new rulers, while all churches were already converted to mosques. Matthew was finally allowed to use a small chapel as his new cathedral. In 1368 the Ecumenical Patriarch issued a pronouncement uniting the metropolitan of Pyrgion with Ephesus "forever"; the document notes that the metropolitan of Ephesus had not been able for the previous three years to re-enter his church due to local hostility. But even this union did not prevent the metropolitan from further decline, and by 1387 the small community could not support even a small priest; as a result, the metropolitan was granted the sees of Pergamum, Clazomenae, and New Phocaea.

Similar difficulties were also faced by the 15th-century metropolitan Mark of Ephesus.

As a result of the Ottoman conquest and subsequent introduction of Islam in the region in the 14th century, the local Christian element declined dramatically. This had a negative impact on the ecclesiastical administration, since conversions of the indigenous population—often by force—were on a large scale.

During the 16th century, the see of the metropolis moved to Teira (modern Tire), while probably during the late 17th century it was transferred to Magnesia ad Sipylum (modern Manisa). From the 17th century, as a result of the increase of the Greek Orthodox element in Anatolia, a number of new metropoleis were created and consequently the area of the Metropolis of Ephesus was reduced. Nevertheless, the jurisdiction of the diocese of Ephesus still included a vast area in western Anatolia and was divided into three metropolitan districts: Magnesia, Kordelio and Kydonies (modern Ayvalık).

In 1821, during the massacre that broke out in Constantinople, as a retaliation of the Greek War of Independence, the metropolitan bishop of Ephesus, Dionysios, was among the Greek Orthodox upper clergy that was executed by the Ottoman authorities.

At the beginning of the 20th century the area of the metropolis was further reduced with the creation of additional metropoleis, like that of Kydonies (1908) and Pergamon (1922). Most of the diocese became part of the Greek-controlled Smyrna Occupation Zone in 1919. However, due to the developments of the Greco-Turkish War of 1919–1922 the local Orthodox element evacuated the region in the Greek-Turkish population exchange.

Known bishops

 St Timothy the first bishop of Ephesus
 Onesimus the second bishop of Ephesus. 
 seven of Onesimus relatives
 Gaius of Ephesus 
 Polycrates of Ephesus fl. 130-196
 Apollonius of Ephesus  fl. 220
 Heraclides, bishop of Ephesus fl. 403
 Memnon fl. 440
 Bassianus (bishop) c. 444
 Stephen of Ephesus (448-51), attendee of the Council of Chalcedon and first recorded source of the seven sleepers of Ephesus.
 Paul, Miaphysite Bishop of Ephesus 475
 John of Ephesus  fl. 507-588
 Hypatius (c. 530)
 Abraham (after 542 or 553)
 Theodosius III c. 729-745
 Theodosius of Ephesus fl. 754
 Gregorius of Ephesus fl. 914-927
 Theodore of Ephesus (r. 1014–1018/1019)
 Kyriakos of Ephesus (r. 1018/1019(?)–1037)
 Michael VII Doukas c. 1080
 Nicholas Mesarites c. 1207
 Nicephorus  1260
 Joseph II of Constantinople fl. 1393
 Mark of Ephesus c. 1395-1438
 Dionysios of Ephesus 1821
 Anthimus VI of Constantinople 1837
 Chrysostomos II of Athens 1922

Monuments of worship

Past monuments

In Ephesus and the surrounding area a considerable number of monasteries were founded most probably already from the early Byzantine period. Later, in the 11th century, a new monastic community was created north of the city, which consisted of several monasteries, known as Mount Galesios. Among these monasteries, three were founded by Osios Lazaros: the Monastery of Saint Saviour, the Theotokos and of the Resurrection.

According to Christian traditions, Ephesus was the burial place of several Christian saints and martyrs. Saint Timothy was martyred on Pion Hill, today's Panayır dağ. 
Others said to be buried there include Philip the Evangelist, Saint Hermione, Mary Magdalene, Paul of Thebes, Aristobulus and the martyrs Adauctus and his daughter Callisthene. However, no monuments related with any of the above saints, have been excavated yet in Panayır dağ. According to a 12th-century account, the pilgrims could worship the relics of 300 holy persons, like that of Saint Alexander and Mary Magdalene. Another significant pilgrim site was the cave of the Seven Sleeping Children. Due to the holiness of the place, several notables during the medieval period, expressed their will to be buried near the cave. During this period, a complex of chapels, mausoleums and tombs was erected next to the site.

Surviving monuments
The Church of Saint John the Evangelist, was probably erected during the 2nd or 3rd century and was the most important pilgrim place in Ephesus. It was built on his tomb, on the site of an earlier shrine. In the 6th century Emperor Justinian I provided the expenses for the construction of a three-aisled basilica on the same place. Tradition conveys that the church, apart from personal objects of John, also contained the stone on which Jesus' body was rinsed after the Deposition from the cross.

Notes

References

Sources

 

Metropolis, Ephesus
Ephesus
Metropolis, Ephesus
Ephesus
Dioceses established in the 1st century
Eastern Orthodox dioceses in Turkey